PCB Strikers are a Pakistani women's cricket team that compete in the Pakistan Women's One Day Cup and the PCB Women's Twenty20 Tournament. The team has no geographical base, instead being made up of some of the best players from across Pakistan. They are captained by Muneeba Ali and coached by Waqar Orakzai. The side was formed ahead of the 2021–22 Pakistan Women's One Day Cup, adding to the previously three-team competition as a reflection of the growing number of female cricketers in Pakistan.

History
PCB Strikers were formed in 2021 to compete in the Pakistan Women's One Day Cup, expanding the competition from three teams to four, to allow greater opportunities for players to participate. In their first season, they were captained by Kainat Imtiaz and coached by Arshad Khan. In the group stage, they won two matches, both against PCB Dynamites, to finish third. They again beat PCB Dynamites in the third place play-off.

In 2022–23, they competed in their first PCB Women's Twenty20 Tournament. The side finished third in the group stage, with one victory.

Players

Current squad
Based on squad for the 2022–23 season. Players in bold have international caps.

Seasons

Pakistan Women's One Day Cup

PCB Women's Twenty20 Tournament

Honours
 Pakistan Women's One Day Cup:
 Winners (0):
 Best finish: 3rd (2021–22)
 PCB Women's Twenty20 Tournament:
 Winners (0):
 Best finish: 3rd (2022–23)

References

Women's cricket teams in Pakistan
2021 establishments in Pakistan